15415 Rika, provisional designation , is a bright background asteroid from the Florian region of the inner asteroid belt, approximately  in diameter. It was discovered on 4 February 1998, by Japanese astronomer Akimasa Nakamura at the Kuma Kogen Astronomical Observatory in southern Japan. The presumed S-type asteroid has a rotation period of 6.36 hours and possibly an elongated shape. It was named after Rika Akana, a character in the Japanese film and later television adapted drama Tokyo Love Story.

Orbit and classification 

Rika is a non-family asteroid of the main belt's background population when applying the hierarchical clustering method to its proper orbital elements. Based on osculating Keplerian orbital elements, the asteroid has also been classified as a member of the Flora family, a giant asteroid family and the largest family of stony asteroids in the main-belt.

It orbits the Sun in the inner asteroid belt at a distance of 1.7–2.7 AU once every 3 years and 3 months (1,193 days; semi-major axis of 2.2 AU). Its orbit has an eccentricity of 0.23 and an inclination of 7° with respect to the ecliptic.

The body's observation arc begins with a precovery published by the Digitized Sky Survey and taken at the Palomar Observatory in November 1954, more than 43 years prior to its official discovery observation at Kuma Kogen.

Physical characteristics 

Rika is an assumed, common S-type asteroid, despite the exceptionally high albedo (see below) measured by the Wide-field Infrared Survey Explorer (WISE).

Rotation period 

In October 2006, a rotational lightcurve of Rika was obtained from photometric observations by astronomers at the Skalnaté pleso Observatory in Slovakia. Lightcurve analysis gave a well-defined rotation period of 6.3636 hours with a high brightness amplitude of 1.06 magnitude, indicating that the body has an elongated shape.

Diameter and albedo 

According to the survey carried out by the NEOWISE mission of NASA's WISE telescope, Rika measures 2.830 kilometers in diameter and its surface has a high albedo of 0.6053. The Collaborative Asteroid Lightcurve Link assumes an albedo of 0.24 – derived from 8 Flora, the parent body of the Flora family – and calculates a diameter of 3.74 kilometers based on an absolute magnitude of 14.3.

Naming 

This minor planet was named after Rika Akana, the heroine played by Honami Suzuki in the manga-based Japanese television drama Tokyo Love Story. Some episodes of the dorama were filmed on locations near the town of Kumakōgen, where the discovering observatory of this asteroid is located.

The official naming citation was published by the Minor Planet Center on 13 October 2000.

Notes

References

External links 
 Asteroid Lightcurve Database (LCDB), query form (info )
 Dictionary of Minor Planet Names, Google books
 Discovery Circumstances: Numbered Minor Planets (15001)-(20000) – Minor Planet Center
 
 

015415
Discoveries by Akimasa Nakamura
Named minor planets
19980204